Košarkarski klub Žoltasti Troti (English: Basketball Club Žoltasti Troti), commonly referred to as KK Žoltasti Troti, Žoltasti Troti or simply Troti, is a basketball team based in Novo Mesto, Slovenia. The team competes in the Slovenian Second Basketball League. The team's home arena is Livada Sports Centre.

Season-by-season records

Players

Current squad

Honours 
 Slovenian Second Division
Runners-up: 2021–22

 Slovenian Third DivisionWinners: 2017–18

 Slovenian Fourth DivisionWinners:''' 2016–17

References

External links 
 
 Club profile at eurobasket.com

Basketball teams in Slovenia
Basketball teams established in 2010
Sport in Novo Mesto
2010 establishments in Slovenia